Maryon is a given name. Notable people with the given name include:

Maryon Eilertsen (1950–2015), Norwegian actress and theatre director
Maryon Kantaroff (1933–2019), Canadian sculptor
Maryon Pearson (1901–1989), Canadian wife of Prime Minister
Maryon Pittman Allen (1925–2018), American journalist 
Maryon Stewart, English women health writer

See also
Maryon (surname)